Hannah Blank (born June 13, 1930, in New York City, New York) is an American author.

Bibliography 
A Murder of Convenience (1999) 
Brave Man Dead (2001) 
A Short Life on a Sunny Isle (2002)

See also
List of horror fiction authors

References

External links 
 Hannah Blank Official Website

1930 births
Living people
20th-century American novelists
21st-century American novelists
20th-century American women writers
21st-century American women writers
Writers from New York City